Maître (spelled Maitre according to post-1990 spelling rules) is a commonly used honorific for lawyers, judicial officers and notaries in France, Belgium, Switzerland and French-speaking parts of Canada. It is often written in its abbreviated form Me  or plural Mes in Belgian French and Canadian English.

The origin of the honorific Maître is from the civil law tradition, and still widely used in France and Québec.

See also
 Esquire#Usage in the United States, equivalent honorific for lawyers in American English

References

Honorifics
Mai
Law of Belgium
French words and phrases